François Pagi (7 September 1654 – 21 January 1721) was a French Franciscan historian of the Catholic Church.

Life
Pagi was born at Lambesc in Provence. 
After studying with the Oratorians at Toulon, he became a Conventual Franciscan, and was three times provincial.  He died at Orange, France.

Works
He assisted his uncle Antoine Pagi in the correction of the Annales Ecclesiastici of Baronius; and edited the Critica of his uncle. He wrote his own history of the popes up to the year 1447: Breviarium historico-chronologico-criticum illustriora Pontificum romanorum gesta, conciliorum generalium acta ... complectens (4 vols., Antwerp, 1717–27). The history was continued in two volumes by his nephew, Antoine Pagi the Younger (Antwerp, 1748–53).

References

Attribution

1654 births
1721 deaths
Conventual Friars Minor
17th-century French historians
French male writers
18th-century French historians